The Food Wars is a 2009 book by Walden Bello which examines the food crisis and issues relating to food security.

It was originally published on 25 September 2009, .

References

2009 non-fiction books
Food politics